Helmut Krackowizer (29 April 1922 – 22 October 2001) was an Austrian motorcycle racer and motor journalist with an international reputation, specializing in vintage motorcycles.

Early life 
Krackowizer's life was shaped in large part by motorcycles and also by automobiles. Born in Austria in 1922, he started to create motorcycle drawings while he was a schoolboy, long before he was able to ride his first motorcycle, a 250 cc NSU, at the age of 16. He soon replaced this motorcycle with a 500 cc Norton "International".

During his school summer vacations, Helmut worked as a mechanic and went to races whenever possible. In 1932, he attended one of the first races on the Gaisberg near Salzburg. He took advantage of any opportunity to ride a motorcycle, to buy one (A Rudge 250 cc two valves, his first racing motorcycle after the Second World War), or to rescue one. He saw the end of the war as a fighter controller of the Air Signal Corps in a night interception troop – on a motorcycle – in Norway.

The Motorcycle Professor 
After Krackowizer retired from active racing in 1955, he began to track down historic Motorcycles all over Europe. He kept some of these finds and had them restored, others he exchanged and sold again. In 1967 he founded the third Motor Veterans Club in Austria, the Motor Veterans Club Salzburg. In 1976 Krackowizer was also president of the Austrian Motor Veterans Association for a short time.

Helmut Krackowizer knew almost every historical motorcycle in detail, knew the stories of rare motorcycles and the biographies of their racers, most of whom he had also met personally and were also among his friends, such as Sammy Miller [trial world champion], John Surtees [only automobile and motorcycle world champion], Walter Zeller, Luigi Taveri (multiple motorcycle world champion on Honda from Switzerland), Hans Haldemann (sidecar racer from Switzerland, Georg "Schorsch" Meier (in 1939 Meier was the first non-British to win the 500 cc class, the so-called Senior TT, at the infamous Tourist Trophy on the Isle of Man), Alfred Neubauer, the legendary Mercedes-Benz race director, and many others from the motor racing scene. He was a member of the Rudge Enthusiasts Club in England.

He fulfilled a lifelong dream by realizing the great motor veteran race on the Salzburgring, the "Oldtimer Grand Prix", which took place between 1974 and 1987. Stars like Niki Lauda, Juan Manuel Fangio (Argentinean automobile racer), Hans Herrmann and other former automobile and motorcycle racers came to these veteran races for historic automobiles and motorcycles. Well over 100 automobiles and up to 300 motorcycles came to this event at the Salzburgring in the best years. Mercedes Benz sent the famous Silver Arrows, BMW and Audi brought historical racing cars from their museums to Salzburg. 

However, his efforts to establish a Motor Veteran Museum in Salzburg were unsuccessful. Attempts were made to convert the Stadl in the Hellbrunn Palace Park for this purpose, but these failed due to bureaucratic considerations on the part of the municipality of Salzburg. Thus, some collections of vintage motorcycles and automobiles whose owners Krackowizer had already won over for the project (such as Walter Brandstetter from St. Pölten) went to domestic and foreign motor museums. And until today (as of 2019) no suitable space for historical technology (of all kinds) has been created in Salzburg to present rarities to posterity.

Career

Motorcycle racing 
In autumn of 1946, he rode his first motorcycle race with his Rudge 250 cm3 under heavy rain during the first post-war race in Salzburg-Nonntal, Austria. He came in third.

Then in spring of 1947, the first dirt track race in Salzburg, organized by the just founded SAMTC (Salzburg automobile motorcycle and touring club), attracted 20.000 spectators on the trotting racecourse in Salzburg-Aigen. The SAMTC's first motorcycle race took place on the motorway in Salzburg-Liefering on 6 July 1947. 1958 this race became the Grand Prix of Austria for motorcycles, which moved later on the motorway Anif-Grödig, also near Salzburg and in the end on the Salzburgring, where the race had been upgraded in 1970 to a world champion race.

In that motorcycle race on 6 July 1947, Krackowizer won the junior class 250 cc on Rudge in 44:32,8 min., followed by the Salzburgians Fritz Walcher on New Imperial with a time of 46:43,4 min. and Richard Kwitt on Puch in 46:43,4 min. Krackowizer was then also in the senior race three laps into the lead before he had to abandon because of a defect. This was the beginning of his motorcycle racer career lasting until 1955.

The year 1947 became one of the most successful racing years for him. Among other races he took part in Austria in Rankweil and Lustenau (Vorarlberg), in Innsbruck-Hungerburg hill climb race, in Graz-Lazarett Siedlung and Ries hill climb race, Pötschen Pass as well as in Liechtenstein at the Triesenberg. The year's result of 1947: three first places, two-class records, two-second places, two fourth places – the most successful racer of Austria in class A to 250 cm3. Today one would say "Austrian motorcycle champion". 

In 1948, he intended to take part in the Isle of Man TT, but failed to do so because of missing border documents at the Swiss border. In the following years he rode with changing success also abroad, e.g. in Olten and Erlen, at the "Schauinsland" hill climb race, in Ingolstadt and the Norisring in Nuremberg as well as on the Hockenheim.

Over the years he rode several motorcycle marks as there had been: Rudge 250 cm3, Velocette KTT MK VIII 350 cm3 ex Binder, BSA Gold Star 350 cm3 Lohner scooter, Norton 500 cm3, AJS, Puch, and others. In 1955, he retired from his active motorcycle racing career.

Journalism 
After he graduated from the University of Economics at Vienna, he began his profession in 1952, at the factory Eternit at Vöcklabruck, Upper Austria. He moved to Salzburg in 1955 to start his career as public relations and advertising manager at Porsche Austria. Later on, he moved to Mercedes Benz (1964) and British Leyland (1969). His last job until his retirement in 1987 had been with Chrysler (renamed in Talbot and finally merged with Peugeot).

During this time, he wrote articles on motorcycle races for various magazines within German and English-speaking areas. and revisited his childhood hobby of drawing famous racing motorcycles. His drawings were first published with great success in 1965. Having written and published books on motorcycles, including Motorcycle Sport and The History of Famous Makes of Motorcycle, he returned to his drawings, particularly pencil drawings showing fine details of a motorcycle. He continued this hobby until the last months of his life.

He had been an expert for nearly every type of motorcycle, knowing every history of them, curriculum vitae of most of the racers of former times. He had counted as a friend e.g. Sammy Miller, John Surtees, Walter Zeller, Luigi Taveri, Hans Haldemann, Georg Meier and many other of the motor race scenery.

On the morning of 22 October 2001, he died after suffering his third heart attack on Monday, 15 October, at the age of 80.

Publications 
 TOEFF Land Schweiz, SERAG AG Verlag, Pfäffikon, 1992, 
 Motorrad Album, Markt Buch, VF Verlagsgesellschaft Wiesbaden, 1990, 
 Motorräder – Berühmte Marken von Adler bis Zenith, Markt Buch VF Verlagsgesellschaft Wiesbaden 1988, 
 Motorräder – Berühmte Marken von AJS bis Zündapp, Welsermühl Verlag
 25 Motorrad WM, 1975, Welsermühl Verlag
 Meilensteine der Motorradgeschichte von 1885 bis heute, Motorbuch Verlag, Stuttgart
 Meilensteine der Motorradgeschichte, 1995, Gondrom Verlag GmbH
 Horex Regina bis Imperator 1950–56, Motorbuch Verlag, Stuttgart, 1986
 Österreichische Kraftfahrzeuge. Von Anbeginn bis heute, 1982
 Die klassischen Rennmotorräder, Motorbuch Verlag, Stuttgart,1965

Sources 
 "The Classic Motor Cycle" August/September 1982: "Happy birthday Helmut", Vic Willoughby
 "KURIER Motor" Vienna, April 30, 1982: "Die ungenießbaren Tellernocken"
 "AMC" 6/1984: "Leuchtender Stern" (BSA "Gold Star")
 "Classic Bike" April 1989: "The Rudge that Brumm built", by Helmut Krackowizer
 "Markt" 7/1990: "Eine Runde für Wal! Mit Walter Handleys 1930er Rudge fuhr Dr. Krackowizer noch einmal über die TT-Strecke auf der Isle of Man"
 "Austro Classic", 3/1997: "Happy birthday, Professor Dr. Helmut Krackowizer 'Rudge 1' "
 "Motorrad Classic" 3/1997:  "Der Motorrad Professor"
 "Moto Sport Schweiz"  19/1997 and 18/1981
 "Salzburger Nachrichten" April 26, 1997 "British only mit Krackowizer"
 "VFV Info 2/1997": "Motorrad-Professor Dr. Krackowizer"

References

20th-century Austrian journalists
1922 births
2001 deaths
Austrian male writers
Austrian motorcycle racers